Keller Site is a historic archaeological site located near St. Stephen, Berkeley County, South Carolina.  The site is abundant in shell and other organic material and the site research indicates a strong potential for recovering features that would provide information on pre-historic and historic architecture.

It was listed in the National Register of Historic Places in 1980.

References

Archaeological sites on the National Register of Historic Places in South Carolina
National Register of Historic Places in Berkeley County, South Carolina